Black Rock, Nova Scotia may refer to the following places in Nova Scotia:

Black Rock, Colchester County
Black Rock, Cumberland County
Black Rock, Kings County
Black Rock, Victoria County